Patrice Alègre (born 20 June 1968) is a French serial killer who was sentenced to life imprisonment in 2002 with a minimum term of 22 years for five murders, an attempted murder, and six rapes. He, subsequently, was acquitted of four additional murder charges on 3 July 2008.

The investigation into the Alègre case started in May 2003, after the gendarmes of the Homicide Cell 31 unit (the police officials were ordered to investigate for possible victims of Alègre from 2000 to 2003 by Michel Roussel) reopened several cold cases. Alègre and several members of the red light community claimed to have been part of a sex trafficking network and that the murders happened in connection with BDSM sex.

Biography 

Patrice Alègre, born 20 June 1968, in Toulouse, was the unwanted child of an often-described violent police officer and a teenage hairdresser who often cheated on her husband, sometimes in front of Alègre. Alègre grew up in Saint-Geniès-Bellevue and was expelled from three secondary schools before he settled on the field of general mechanics. He lived with his grandmother for 14 years in the Izards district of Toulouse. While he lived with her, he dropped out of school after the fourth grade and turned to delinquency, theft, and drug trafficking. He eventually became homeless at the age of 13. He would later tell his psychiatrists that he had been sexually abused and that his father repeatedly tried to stop him from offending. Alègre committed his first sexual assault at age 16.

In January 1988, Alègre met Cécile Chambert, an official of bourgeois origin, with whom he had a daughter born on 23 July 1989. Despite the relative stability of his relationship, he gradually became more immersed in crime. Alègre found his victims in the station's district while he was employed as a barman in the police station cafeteria and then at the Gare de Toulouse-Matabiau's buffet restaurant. When women he tried to seduce did not reciprocate, he would undress, rape, and strangle them. He killed his first victim, Valérie Tariote, a co-worker, on 21 February 1989. On 16 February 1995, after a dispute where Alègre turned violent, Chambert left the apartment with their daughter and Alègre moved in with his mistress, the manager of a nightclub where he was hired as a bouncer. He was fired from the nightclub for starting fights that scared away customers.

On 14 June 1997, during a mechanic held in Foix, Alègre encountered Mireille Normand, a 35-year-old woman living alone in a chalet in Verdun. Calling himself Franck, he offered her his services as a handyman in exchange for lodging. On 19 June, he raped and strangled her. Her body was found buried in her garden three weeks later. Alègre went on vacation in Spain, Germany, and Belgium, before returning to Paris where he lodged with Isabelle Chicherie, an SNCF employee. He raped, strangled, and burned her body on 4 September 1997. The gendarmes wiretapped Alègre's relatives' phones and convinced one of his friends to cooperate with the investigators, who then told Alègre to meet at a drop-off point in Châtenay-Malabry, where he was arrested on 5 September 1997. His arrest attracted little attention from the media, which was primarily focused on the death of Princess Diana.

The case

Investigation
In 2002 the special investigation unit, Homicide 31, was created to investigate cold cases concerning murders that Alègre could have been responsible for.
Homicide 31 found patterns typical for a serial killer in the murder of Josette Poiroux (also known as "Linda"), who was stabbed and burned at her studio in Toulouse in 1992. Another murder that showed a similar pattern was Josette Legoy's, a prostitute strangled in her apartment on 4 December 1987. In May 2002, Alègre was indicted for both murders. Furthermore, he was accused of the murders of Line Galbardi in January 1992 and of Patricia Ballejos in December 1992 and the rape of a prostitute in 1997.
Overall, Homicide 31, searched through 191 unsolved murders in the region in the time between 1986 and 1997. In addition, the unit reopened autopsy files classified as suicides in the Haute-Garonne's and 5 other departments. During their investigation, they searched for prostitutes that Alègre pimped out and found two, Florence "Fanny" Khelifi and Christèle "Patricia" Bourre.
In 2005, Judge Thierry Perriquet said that all charges against former Toulouse mayor Dominique Baudis and former deputy prosecutor of Toulouse Marc Bourragué were dismissed.

Dismissal of officer Roussel
In 2004, Perriquet ordered an investigation into the handling of the case by Homicide 31. A police officer, Constable Roussel, together with two justice officials, Lemoine, and the substitute, Heinsch, were accused of having plotted against the accused, Bourragué. Roussel interrogated Khelifi and Bourre alone even though the procedure indicated that at least two officers had to be present. In 2003, a new group of police officers was put into place to investigate the claims made by the former prostitutes. Roussel was forced to retire early.
Roussel later published a book in which he claimed that his investigations were hindered by people within the police force and that the force had been "infiltrated".

Alègre's Letter
Alègre claimed that he had murdered Claude Martinez, a transvestic prostitute, at Baudis' order and another prominent member of society. The journalist Karl Zéro read a letter written by Alègre to him live on air on 15 June.

Bourre's testimony
Bourre alleged that Alègre was part of a network. He found and trained women to prostitute themselves for the network and also organized BDSM soirées. Bourre also said that Alègre was involved in drug trafficking.  She said that she worked as a madame for Alègre and helped him control other women and girls. Bourre claimed to have witnessed the murder of Line Galbardi, who wanted to notify the authorities as to what was happening. She also said that Alègre provided girls to a small club for extreme sadomasochism owned by a homosexual who was murdered in 1996. Some of the sessions "turned badly" and people died. Bourre claims that the owner of the club took videos and photos of attendants in order to protect himself from prosecution.
She also claimed to have become acquainted with Bourragué through Alègre in 1990 and that he took part in orgies with prostitutes. Bourre also claimed that she was raped at S&M sessions by Bourragué. She later named Baudis as a participant.
Bourre claimed that Baudis took part in at least one S&M soirée. She said that on the evening of her 20th birthday, Alègre, Lakhdar Messaoudène, and Dominique Baudis raped her.
Bourre also described the murder of a 16-year-old prostitute killed by Alègre and raped at Messaoudène's order because she was not "enough". In December 1991, the girl was reportedly taken to Noah Lake to be trained by Alègre. Bourre and Line Galbardi were present. However, the 16-year-old refused to take part in the training and was subsequently killed. Line allegedly went to the police to report the murder and was killed by Alègre.

Khelifi's testimony
Khelifi claimed to have witnessed the murder of Line Galbardi from 2 to 3 January 1992 at the Hôtel de l'Europe. She said that she stayed at the brothel to work, heard screams, and went into the room. She alleged that Messaoudène forced all the other girls to witness the torture of Line Galbardi. Alègre raped, beat and strangled Galbardi. Khelifi proceeded to claim that she was abused by members of Toulouse's justice department and intimidated by police after her testimony. Soon afterward she stopped talking to the police. Khelifi was then put into contact with Bourre. They spoke regularly for months. She was examined by a psychiatrist who stated that she was heavily traumatized by what she experienced but that her testimony is credible.
Karl Zéro broadcast an interview with Khelifi about children witnessed hanging on hooks in a torture chamber, on the first floor of a house near Toulouse. Zéro claimed that Khelifi hadn't been paid for the interview but it was revealed later that she received a car valued at roughly 10,000 Euros and that Zéro was working on a book written with Khelifi.
Khelifi went on to change her testimony in September: she said that Meeaoudène was not present at the crime scene and that she was not sexually assaulted by police in 2003. She did, however, indicate that Baudis was a perpetrator.
In July 2005, Khelifi and Bourre were sentenced, respectively, to 18 months and three years in prison for perjury, reporting a false crime, and witness bribery in the Puis case. In addition to their incarceration, they were both deprived of their civil rights for 5 years. On 26 February 2006, the Toulouse Criminal Court found Khelifi and Bourre guilty of defamation and sentenced them to two and three years suspended prison sentences respectively.

Testimony of Puis
Pierre-Olivier Puis (also known as Djamel), a prostitute, testified that S&M evenings were organized by Alègre and others. He said that on some occasions people had died. Puis said that Claude Martinez, a transvestite, was murdered in 1992 and filmed the people taking part in those evenings. In 2003, he stated that in 1996 he saw a ten-year-old girl, Marion Wagon, at one of those evenings. The girl had been reported missing in Agen in November 1996. On 27 May 2003, Puis was indicted for making false accusations and attempted to commit suicide in prison on 28 May 2003. He also retracted the statements that he initially made. On 2 July 2003, he insisted that everything he initially told investigators was true. On 20 September 2003, Puis was found dead in a psychiatric clinic near Toulouse. His death was declared a suicide.

Investigation
On 15 April, the public prosecutor of Toulouse, Michel Bréard, opened a judicial investigation for "pimping in an organized gang, aggravated rape, and complicity, acts of torture and barbarism" against "Patrice Alègre and all others". Judge Perriquet was assigned to the case. Jean Volff, attorney general, failed to notify the chancellery of the opening of the investigation which subsequently lead to him being removed from his position by Dominique Preben. Volff was later implicated to have taken part in the S&M evenings by witnesses.
Bourragué was accused by witnesses of being a part of the sex trafficking network. He admitted to having had an aperitif at home with Alègre in 1991 or 1992 but denied all other accusations.
On 18 May, Baudis stated that he was accused of being part of the sex trafficking network. He denied the claims and said that they were false accusations brought forward by the pornography lobby, who was trying to stop him as he lobbied for having pornographic films banned from television.

André Mayrac, the owner of several libertine clubs, requested to be heard by the courts and indicated that he has photos of the famous "dungeon".

Claims by Charles Louis-Roche and Diane Roche
Charles Louis-Roche and Diane Roche, children of Pierre Roche, who had been the presiding president of the justice chamber at Nimes Court of Appeal during the Alègre affair, claimed that he had been murdered by a sex trafficking network in which he implicated himself. Both of them were charged with "aggravated defamation and invasion of privacy". They then went on create a website to denounce Pierre Roche, as a "corrupt man, unworthy, violent and perverse husband and father", "sickening orgy participant, consumer to the chain of prostitutes of all kinds, who had made their lives a daily hell." Charles and Diane claimed that their father confided to them that he had taken part in the evenings at which ritual sacrifices and tortures took place. They claimed that he had gathered incriminating evidence on people within the network. Charles and Diane claim that later he completely lost his mind and burned tons of documents that were in his possession.

Deaths related to the case

Cover-Up Accusations 
The Alègre affair is considered to be politically butchered. Some murders were initially declared suicides before Alègre's arrest. Several witnesses claimed that the killer was protected for a long time by police officers and members of the judicial system. Former gendarme, Michel Roussel, noted that there were 191 unsolved murders in the region. The organization Stop to Forget brought together the victims' families, who continue to demand the truth from the case, referring to these disappearances as "camouflaged as suicides and covered by truncated, distorted and sloppy investigations".

Alègre was arrested due to Emillie Espès' allegations, who fled after being raped by him on 22 February 1997, when she was 21 years old. The young woman, who was the only surviving victim of Alègre, has since committed suicide.

Chronology of the Alègre case 

 5 September 1997: Arrest of Patrice Alègre, suspected of murder between February 1989 and September 1997. He admitted to five murders, one attempted murder, and six rapes, but was also indicted for four other murders..
 21 February 2002: Alègre is sentenced to life imprisonment with a twenty-year lock-in period. Psychiatrists, Michel Dubec and Daniel Zagury, evoked the hypothesis of "displaced matricide" to explain Alègre's murders, whom they described as "an organized serial killer", "a psychopath",  "a malignant narcissist" having undergone disorganization traumas related to "maternal sexual abuse".
 Homicide Cell 31 of the gendarmes, created in June 2000 to carry out investigations, sought after other possible victims of Alègre on request from the prosecutor. One such case, concerning the 1992 Toulouse murder of the prostitute Line Galbardi, led them to two former Toulouse prostitutes who knew about the disappearance: Christèle 'Patricia' Bourre and Florence 'Fanny' Khelifi.
 1 April 2003, the newspaper La Dépêche du Midi launched a press campaign, released statements from the two women, and put pressure on the justice department to disclose more information. Paris newspapers followed suit and the rumor swelled, fed mainly by two local journalists.
 15 April 2003, the Toulouse prosecutor opened a judicial investigation against Alègre and others accused of committing gang rapes and aggravated rapes.  The investigation looked into acts of torture and barbarism, committed by people abusing the authority that conferred their function, following the statements of former prostitutes Khelifi and Bourre.
 12 May 2003, the weekly Marianne presented the result of their investigations, in particular recent "revelations" made by one of the prostitutes. It involved police officers and a gendarme from Toulouse who "were aware of their actions and the corruption but also organized parties in the presence of at least two Toulouse lawyers and other notables..", with the name of the Toulouse mayor even being quoted.
 18 May 2003, the former mayor of Toulouse, Dominique Baudis denounced the TF1 TV channel for quoting his name in the investigation and claimed it was a "frightening machination" related to the "pornographic industry".
 19 May 2003, Baudis charged his lawyer with defamation.
 22 May 2003, two prostitutes confirmed their remarks before the judges and Pierre-Olivier Puis, under the pseudonym "Djamel", said that there have been "dead".
 27 May 2003, Jean Volff, Attorney General of Toulouse, announced that his name was also cited in the case. He was replaced the following day. A new judicial investigation was opened against Puis, Khelifi, and Bourre for alleging crimes and imaginary misdemeanors, false testimonies, and complicity. Puis was placed in custody, with Baudis, Volff and Marc Bourragué becoming civil parties in the case.
 13 June 2003, Baudis accused the head of La Dépêche du Midi, Jean-Michel Baylet, of plotting against him.
 30 June 2003, on the day of his installation in the highest court of appeal, Volff protested in Le Figaro against the way he was treated by Dominique Perben, Minister of Justice and media.
 17 September 2003, Khelifi retracted her rape charges against Baudis.
 20 September 2003, Puis was found dead in a room of a Toulouse clinic.
 11 July 2005, the investigating chamber of the Court of Appeals of Toulouse discussed the component of "rapes and organized pimping gangs" in which Baudis and others were implicated in.
 December 2005, 32-year-old Khelifi was indicted for slanderous denunciation against Baudis and Bourragué.
 September 2006, Bourre was indicted for slanderous denunciation against Baudis.
 2006, Emilia Espès, the only survivor of Alègre's attacks, committed suicide.
 28 March 2008, the prosecution announced that the ex-prostitutes would be tried in correctional for "slanderous denunciation" towards Baudis and Volff. After returning to their initial statements they were found guilty and respectively sentenced to two and three years in prison, which were suspended by the Toulouse Criminal Court on 26 March 2009.
 3 July 2008, the investigating judges of Toulouse district, Serge Lemoine and Fabrice Rives made an order of dismissal concerning three homicides and rape with a weapon connected with Alègre.
 September 2019, after having served his minimum 22-year term in prison, Alègre applied for parole.

Alègre's confirmed victims
 1985, raped a 17-year-old, attempted to strangle her afterwards
 2/21/1989 Valérie Tariote, 21, waitress, found dead with her hands tied, gagged, naked, panties torn, a scarf at the back of her throat and a pan of blood under her head, initially declared a suicide.
 01/25/1990 Laure Martinet, raped and killed.
 02/11/1997, Martine Matias, 29, was beaten, rendered unconscious with chloroform and her house was set on fire. Initially declared a suicide.
 3/1997, Emilie Espes was raped by Alègre and was almost strangled. Espes reported to police afterwards that she was raped by a stranger and described Alègre.
 6/19/1997, Mireille Normand, 35, was raped and killed.
 9/4/1997, Isabelle Chicherie, 31, strangled.

Suspected Victims
 9/23/1990, 23-year-old Edith Schleichardt, found dead with a jacket pulled up on the chest. Panties and tights were found removed, a tear gas canister trapped between the thighs, ruled a suicide by drug overdose.

References

See also

Bibliography 

 Books about the case (in chronological order)
 Michel Roussel, Homicide 31 - Au cœur de l'affaire Alègre, Éditions Denoël, 24 January 2004, 240 pages, 
 Ugo Rankl, Patrice Alègre, l'homme qui tuait les femmes, Éditions Nicolas Philippe, 21 October 2004, 388 pages, 
 Christian English and Frédéric Thibaud, Affaires non classées, tome II (Chapter: L'affaire Patrice Alègre), First edition, 15 June 2004, 294 pages, 
 Dominique Baudis, Face à la calomnie, XO Éditions, 20 January 2005, 318 pages, 
 Pierre Alfort and Stéphane Durand-Souffland, J'ai défendu Patrice Alègre, Éditions du Seuil, 28 January 2005, 188 pages, 
 Marie-France Etchegoin and Mathieu Aron, Le bûcher de Toulouse, D'Alègre à Baudis : histoire d'une mystification, Éditions Grasset et Fasquelle, 18 May 2005, 425 pages, 
 Gilbert Collard and Édouard Martial, L'étrange Affaire Alègre, Éditions du Rocher, 9 June 2005, 186 pages, 
 Jean Volff, Un procureur général dans la tourmente. Les dérives de l'affaire Alègre, L'Harmattan, Paris, 2006, 192 pages, 
 Antoine Perraud, La barbarie journalistique, Flammarion, 30 January 2007, 193 pages, 
 Georges Fenech, Presse-Justice: liaisons dangereuses, L'Archipel, 7 March 2007, 190 pages, 
 Gilles Souillés, L'Affaire Alègre, la vérité assassinée, Hugo et compagnie, 22 May 2007, 276 pages, 
 Agnès Grossmann, L'enfance des criminels, éd. Hors Collection, 20 September 2012, 298 pages, 
 Jean Volff, Servir, éd. Jerôme Do-Bentzinger, 12 April 2013, 496 pages, 
 Novel inspired by the case
 G.M. Bon, Contes cruels, Toulouse, Éditions l'Écailler du Sud, 1 September 2004 (Roman noir), 248 pages,

Press articles 

 Press articles on the Alègre Affair in La Dépêche du Midi.
 "Patrice Alègre is getting married in prison" Article by Marie Desnos published on 14 July 2009 in Paris Match.

TV documentaries 
 Affaires criminelles, presented by Yves Rénier on 7 February 10 July, 16 and 21 August, 21 and 29 October, 2 and 12 November 2010, "The Patrice Alègre Case" on NT1.
 Get the Accused, "Patrice Alègre, the blood and the rumor" presented by Frédérique Lantieri, broadcast on 18 January 2015, on France 2, 115 minutes.
 "I defended Patrice Alègre" in Toute une histoire 17 March 2016, on France 2.
 "Alègre: the cold-blooded killer" (first report) in "Special: they made Toulouse tremble" on 26 September 2016, in Crimes on NRJ 12.

Related articles 
 List of French serial killers
 List of serial killers by country

External links 
 Association Stop à l'Oubli
 Biography of Patrice Alègre on a site devoted to criminal cases.
 Biography of Patrice Alègre on a site devoted to criminal cases.

1968 births
Criminals from Toulouse
French people convicted of murder
French rapists
French serial killers
Living people
Male serial killers
Murder in France
People convicted of murder by France
People with antisocial personality disorder
Prisoners sentenced to life imprisonment by France